A Haitian Bahamian) is a Bahamian resident or citizen of full or partial Haitian ancestry. The Bahamas currently does not allow dual citizenship, so those who are Bahamian citizens must renounce their Haitian citizenship.

See also
 Bahamas–Haiti relations

References

 

 
 
Ethnic groups in the Bahamas
Haitian diaspora in North America